Oka Criminal Prema Katha is a 2014 Telugu crime fiction film written & directed by P. Sunil Kumar Reddy and produced by Ravindra Babu Yakkali on Sravya Films banner. It features Manoj Nandam, Priyanka Pallavi & Satyanand in main roles. The film released on 18 July 2014.

Plot
Sreenu (Manoj Nandam) is a young man, who works in a small video library in his village. One fine day, he falls for Bindu(Priyanka Pallavi) and reveals his love for her. After some days of wooing him, even Bindu accepts his love. Twist in the tale arises when Bindu’s family leaves their village and goes to Vizag, to live with her uncle (Satyanand). A depressed Sreenu follows Bindu to Vizag, and finds out her address. He starts working as a canteen boy in the same college where she studies. Sreenu gets an even bigger shock, as Bindu starts ignoring him in college. Depressed, he tries to commit suicide and knowing this, Bindu again comes close to him and asks him to murder a person for her. The rest of the story is whether Sreenu murdered him and why Bindu wanted that person to be murdered.

Cast
Manoj Nandam as Sreenu
Priyanka Pallavi as Bindu
Satyanand as Bindu's uncle

Reception
The film received moderate reviews from critic. Deccan Chronicle wrote "The director’s aim is good, but the way the story has been depicted on screen is not convincing. Maybe he has targeted only college students and youth and not kept family audiences in mind. That’s why unlike his earlier films, ‘Oka Criminal Prema Katha’ fails to make an impact. The publicity posters and his earlier films may bring in college youth, but this film is definitely not for all." Oneindia Entertainment gave a review stating "Oka Criminal Prema Katha does not offer any direct message to the audience. Indirectly, the movie shows that the parents, who are the first role models to their children, are responsible for the kind of behavior the youth have. Though the director has tried out something different, but he has failed to give a convincing picture on screen." 123telugu.com gave a review stating "On the whole, Oka Criminal Prema Katha sends out the intended message very loud and clear. The way today’s women and youth face problems in the society has been showcased nicely. But the way it has been narrated in a non commercial format, and with a bit of harsh reality will not be liked by one and all" and rated the film 2.5/5. IndiaGlitz gave a review stating "Technically, it’s quite mediocre but the narration manages to make a mark. At a time when even supposedly pro-women films parade profanity and obscenity under the pretext of exposing the vulgarity and mean-mindedness of lecherous men, this film is praiseworthy in that bold scenes have a meaningful presence. A film that works for its honesty and creative story-telling" and rated the film 2/5.

References

2014 films
Indian romantic thriller films
Indian crime drama films